Équipe de Voltige de l'Armée de l'Air is a French Air and Space Force (Armée de l'air et de l'espace) Air Force Aerobatics Display Team located at Salon-de-Provence Air Base, Bouches-du-Rhône, France which operates the Extra EA-300.

See also

 List of French Air and Space Force aircraft squadrons

References

French Air and Space Force squadrons